Trinity Church is a Roman Catholic  church in Halmstad in Sweden. It is part of Saint Mary's Roman Catholic Parish within the Catholic Diocese of Stockholm.

It was opened on 24 May 1981.

References

Halmstad
Roman Catholic churches in Sweden
1981 establishments in Sweden
Churches completed in 1981